Hundorp is the administrative centre of Sør-Fron Municipality in Innlandet county, Norway. The European route E6 highway and the Dovrebanen railway line both pass through the village.

Hundorp was also the centre of the petty kingdom of Gudbrandsdalen and as such, it was an important place for religion and politics. Dale-Gudbrand's farm, the farm once populated by the ancient ruler Dale-Gudbrand, was chosen as the millennium site of Oppland county.

Name
The village is named after the old Hundorp farm. The first element is hundr which means 'dog' or 'hound'. The last element is þorp which means 'village'. The name is probably reflecting the fact that at one time this was a village of dog-breeding.

References

Sør-Fron
Villages in Innlandet
Populated places on the Gudbrandsdalslågen